Chiyang Subdistrict  is a subdistrict under the jurisdiction of Guichi District, Chizhou City, Anhui Province, People's Republic of China. Chiyang Subdistrict's government office is located in the north of Guichi, bordering the Yangtze River in the north, Qiupu Subdistrict in the south, the old Qingxi River in the east, and Baiyang and Qiupu Rivers in the west. , it administers the following six residential neighborhoods:
Xiushan
Gushun
Yanliuyuan
Nanxinyuan
Qiujiang
Qingfeng

See also
List of township-level divisions of Anhui

References

Township-level divisions of Anhui
Chizhou
Subdistricts of the People's Republic of China